Eldora Park was an amusement park that opened in 1901 in Eldora, Pennsylvania. It survived for three decades before closing from poor economics and declining attendance.

Eldora Park was located in the Black Diamond area of Carroll Township between Charleroi, Donora and Monongahela in Washington County. It was on the Pittsburgh Railways Company's interurban trolley that ran from Roscoe to Pittsburgh. It was a popular location for outings for mine worker unions, schools, community associations, and for family reunions.

The park had a merry-go-round, a roller coaster, a motion picture tent called the Electric Theatre, slides, swings, picnic tables, a restaurant, and a dance pavilion.  

The park's Figure Eight roller coaster is believed to have been designed by Frederick Ingersoll, a native Pittsburgher who designed, built, and operated a roller coaster at Kennywood Park called the Figure Eight and opened Luna Park, Pittsburgh in 1905.

The popularity of Eldora Park's amusement park declined in the 1920s, while the dance hall continued to host big bands through the 1930s. Lawrence Welk, Frank Lombardo, and The Golden Gate Five (a popular local band) were among the headliners.  Steve Woodward, Guy Moffitt and Tom Sloan were financial backers credited with building the park on property formerly owned by the Wickerham family, one of the pioneer families in the area.

The Depression, World War II, declining ridership on the trolley, and interest in other forms of entertainment, are all credited with the park's demise.

The dance hall was used as a roller skating rink before the park closed in the 1940s.

The park was chartered to the Charleroi Girl Scouts in the mid 1940s and used as a day camp called Camp Charwood into the 1970s.  After camp sites (10'x12' railed tent platforms) were built in the woods on the property, Charwood also saw overnight camping through at least the late 1960s.  Great Hall, as the dance hall was then called, was also used by the Girl Scouts for roller skating and, in bad weather, for various other activities.

Noteworthy events
1901 - Eldora (land development) was laid out in 1901 by James A. Pahe with an amusement park popular among the people of Monongahela city.
March, 1904 - Stockholders announced plan to open May 30 
July 9, 1905 - Carrie Nation delivered two lectures.  On the street car on her way to Pittsburgh from Eldora Park after her lectures, Nation caused a scene that was reported in all the local newspapers.  She ripped off, and tore to pieces, an advertisement for beer that originally read "Drunk by all nations" that had been altered by a practical joker to read "Drunk by Carrie nation."
September 22, 1905, Booker T. Washington, spoke at a Monongahela Valley Emancipation Association rally 
September 24, 1911, Gertrude Breslau Hunt, socialist lecturer and author from Chicago spoke 
June 8, 1913, Mary Harris "Mother" Jones (at age 81) spoke at Tri-County (Washington, Westmoreland, and Fayette) association of Socialists event 
June 4, 1939 Lawrence Welk and orchestra performed 
May, 1946 - Girl Scouts plan to open camp in June.  Buildings purchased and land leased by Girl Scouts.
June 19, 1946 - Girl Scout summer camp opened

References

External links
 Eldora Park

Amusement parks in Pennsylvania
Defunct amusement parks in Pennsylvania
1901 establishments in Pennsylvania